Homer James "Jimmy" Pitt (1920 – November 21, 1965) was an American Thoroughbred horse racing trainer who race conditioned Bally Ache to win the 1960 Preakness Stakes, the second leg of the U.S. Triple Crown series.

In addition to his skills handling Thoroughbreds, Jimmy Pitt was widely respected as a man of character. A resident of Safety Harbor, Florida, he was the operator of a public stable based at nearby Sunshine Park. He was described in a February 14,1960 Ocala Star Banner article as a quiet spoken man who did not seek to "bask in the limelight." The newspaper referenced a 1959 magazine article by John Lardner about his reputation and a trainer who had accomplished the remarkable feat of keeping a horse named Bee Lee Tee sound and still racing at the age of 12. Owned and trained by Pitt, on March 14, 1959 the gelding had surpassed the $100,000 mark in career earnings, an amount close to $1,000,000 in 2021 dollars based on inflation.  His success with Bally Ache led to the Florida Turf Writers Association voting Jimmy Pitt the state's outstanding trainer of 1960.

Jimmy Pitt died on November 21, 1965 at West Jersey Hospital in Camden, New Jersey after suffering a heart attack at Garden State Park Racetrack shortly after he had saddled Our Michael to run in the Garden State Stakes.

References

	

1920 births
1965 deaths
American horse trainers
People from Nashville, Tennessee